"Estámos Solos" ("We're Alone") is a song written by Jorge Luis Pilot and performed by Cuban singer Rey Ruiz on his third studio album En Cuerpo y Alma. It was released as the first single from the album which Cashbox critic Héctor Reséndez called "simply perfect overall". Similarly, John Lannert of Billboard cited as "the album's best song".  The track was recognized as one of the best-performing songs of the year at the 1996 ASCAP Latin Awards.

Charts

Year-end charts

See also
List of Billboard Tropical Airplay number ones of 1994 and 1995

References

1995 singles
1995 songs
Rey Ruiz songs
Sony Discos singles
Spanish-language songs